Macarius is a Latinized form of the old Greek given name Makários (Μακάριος), meaning "happy, fortunate, blessed"; confer the Latin beatus and felix. Ancient Greeks applied the epithet Makarios to the gods.

In other languages the name has the following forms:
Finnish: the given name Kari or Karri. Derived surname: Mäkäräinen.
Greek: Makarios (Μακάριος)
Italian: Macario, which is also a family name
Portuguese: Macário
 Spanish Macarena (name)
Russian/Ukrainian/Belarusian: Makar (Макар) from Church Slavonic Makariy (Макарій). Derived surnames: Makarov/Makarova, Makarenko, Makarchuk, Makarevich.
Serbian: Makarije/Макарије
Romanian: Macarescu (surname)
French: Macaire

People named Macarius
Macarius of Alexandria, a martyr, saint, and companion of Faustus, Abibus and Dionysius of Alexandria
Macarius of Egypt (300–390), Egyptian monk and hermit.  Also known as Pseudo-Macarius, Macarius-Symeon, Macarius the Elder, or St. Macarius the Great
Pseudo-Macarius (4th/5th century), Syrian author
Macarius of Jerusalem, Bishop in 314–333
Macarius of Alexandria, also known as Macarius the Younger (died 395)
Macarius Magnes, 4th century Christian author of an apology "Apocriticus"
Macarius I of Antioch: Patriarch of Antioch, deposed in 681
Pope Macarius I of Alexandria, ruled in 933–953
Pope Macarius II of Alexandria, ruled in 1102–1128
Macarius, Archbishop of Esztergom, ruled in 1142–1147
Macarius II of Antioch, Patriarch in 1164–1166
Macarius of Unzha (1349–1444), founder of several Russian monasteries.
Macarius, Metropolitan of Moscow (1482–1563)
Macarius III Ibn al-Za'im, Melkite Patriarch of Antioch from 1647 to 1672
Macarius, elder of Optina monastery
Macarius of Corinth (1731-1805), Metropolitan bishop of Corinth
Macarius IV Tawil, Patriarch of the Melkite Greek Catholic Church in 1813–1815
Macarius I, head of the Holy Synod in 1879–1882 in Russia, better known as his church's leading historian
Macarius (Nevsky), head of the Holy Synod in 1912–1917 in Russia
Makarios I, archbishop of Cyprus from 1854 to 1865
Pope Macarius III of Alexandria, ruled in 1944–1945
Makarios II, archbishop of Cyprus from 1948 to 1950
Makarios III, archbishop (1950–1977) and president of Cyprus (1960–1977)
Archbishop Makarios of Nairobi, Eastern Orthodox Archbishop of Nairobi since 2001
Archbishop Makarios of Australia, Greek Orthodox Archbishop of Australia since 2019
Macarius of Lviv, Metropolitan of Lviv, bishop of the Orthodox Church of Ukraine

References

Masculine given names